The 1955–56 Oklahoma City Chiefs men's basketball team represented Oklahoma City University in the 1955–56 NCAA men's basketball season as an independent. They finished the season 20–7 overall record, and made it to the Elite Eight of the 1956 NCAA basketball tournament. They were coached by Abe Lemons in his first season as head coach of the Chiefs. They played their home games at the Municipal Auditorium in Oklahoma City, Oklahoma.

Schedule

|-
!colspan=12 style=| Regular season

|-
!colspan=12 style=| NCAA Tournament

Rankings

References

Oklahoma City
Oklahoma City
Oklahoma City Stars men's basketball seasons
Oklahoma City C
Oklahoma City C